Samuel Parsons Mulliken (1864 – 1934) was an American professor of organic chemistry at the Massachusetts Institute of Technology.

His son was Nobel laureate Robert S. Mulliken.

References

External links
Books on the Internet Archive

Massachusetts Institute of Technology faculty
20th-century American chemists
1864 births
1934 deaths
People from Newburyport, Massachusetts
Organic chemists